Francis Doyle may refer to:

Frank Doyle (politician) (Francis Edward Doyle, 1922–1984), Australian politician
Sir Francis Hastings Doyle, 1st Baronet, British military officer, of the Doyle baronets
Francis Hastings Doyle (1810–1888), British barrister/administrator/poet
Francis J. Doyle III, American chemical engineer
Francis John Doyle, Australian clergyman and bishop

See also
Frank Doyle (disambiguation)
Doyle (surname)